Söhrewald is a municipality in the district of Kassel, in Hesse, Germany. It is located 13 kilometers southeast of Kassel. The municipality was formed by the former independent municipalities Eiterhagen, Wattenbach and Wellerode in 1970.

Geography 
Söhrewald borders in the north to the  municipality  Lohfelden, in the northeast to the municipality Kaufungen and Helsa all three in the district of Kassel), in the east to the city of Hessisch Lichtenau (Werra-Meißner-Kreis), in the south with the city of Melsungen, in the southeast to the  municipality Körle and in the west to the  municipality Guxhagen (all the three in the district of Schwalm-Eder)

References

Kassel (district)